is a Japanese long-distance runner who specialized in the marathon.

He finished twelfth at the 1995 World Championships in 2:17:30 hours.

Achievements

External links

1970 births
Living people
Japanese male long-distance runners
Japanese male marathon runners